The Last House on the Left is a 1972 American exploitation horror film written, directed and edited by Wes Craven in his directorial debut. The film follows Mari Collingwood (Sandra Peabody), a hippie teenager who is abducted, raped, and tortured by a fugitive family on her seventeenth birthday. When they unwittingly seek refuge in her home, the killers face the vengeance of her parents.

Craven based the film on the 1960 Swedish film The Virgin Spring, directed by Ingmar Bergman, which in turn is an adaptation of the Swedish ballad "Töres döttrar i Wänge". Craven developed the film with producer Sean S. Cunningham after working with him on Together (1971) and once the filmmakers obtained small funding from Hallmark Releasing to make another feature film. Craven wrote a script (originally overtly pornographic) on the concept of shock factor, wanting to depict violence in a realistic matter. Once casting began, Craven promised the actors auditioning that the film would instead be a traditional horror film.

The film was initially damaging to Craven's career and was controversial for its marketing, with the tagline "Can a movie go too far?", advertising its violence. While not being a massive box office draw at drive-ins, it grossed $3 million against a budget of under $90,000. Critics derided the film for its confrontational violence and Craven's use of black comedy—scenes of slapstick comedy intercut with scenes of rape and humiliation. However, it has since achieved a cult following and was nominated for AFI's 100 Years...100 Thrills. The film was particularly troubling for lead actress Peabody, who recalled struggling filming due to a constantly changing script and suffering abuse from her male co-stars. Many of the other actors involved in the film have expressed regret for starring in it decades after its release.

Plot

Mari Collingwood plans to attend a concert with her friend Phyllis Stone, for her seventeenth birthday. Her parents, Estelle and John, express their concern about her friendship with Phyllis, but let her go and give her a peace symbol necklace. Phyllis and Mari head into the city and on the way, they hear a news report of a recent prison escape involving criminals Krug Stillo, a sadistic rapist and serial killer; his heroin-addicted son, Junior; Sadie, a promiscuous psychopath and sadist; and Fred "Weasel" Podowski, a child molester, peeping Tom and murderer. Before the concert, Mari and Phyllis encounter Junior while he is trying to buy marijuana. He leads them to an apartment where they are trapped by the criminals. Phyllis tries to escape and reason with them, but she fails and is gang-raped. Meanwhile, Mari's unsuspecting parents prepare a surprise party for her.

The next morning, Mari and Phyllis are bound, gagged and put in the trunk of Krug's car and transported to the woods. Mari recognizes that the road is near her home. Phyllis is forced to urinate in her jeans and Mari and Phyllis are forced to perform sexual acts on each other. Phyllis distracts the kidnappers to give Mari an opportunity to escape but is chased by Sadie and Weasel, while Junior stays behind to guard Mari. Mari tries gaining Junior's trust by giving him her necklace and calling him "Willow". Phyllis stumbles across a cemetery where she is cornered and stabbed by Weasel. She crawls to a nearby tree and is stabbed to death. Mari convinces Junior to let her go, but her escape is halted by Krug. Krug carves his name into her chest, then rapes her. Mari vomits, quietly says a prayer and walks into a nearby lake, where Krug fatally shoots her.

After they change out of their bloody clothes, the gang goes to the Collingwoods' home, masquerading as travelling salesmen. Mari's parents let them stay overnight. The gang finds photos of Mari and realize it is her home. Later, when Junior is in the midst of a heroin withdrawal, Estelle enters the bathroom to check on him and sees Mari's peace symbol necklace around his neck. She finds blood-soaked clothing in their luggage and overhears them talking about Mari's death, and of her disposal in a nearby lake.

Estelle and her husband rush into the woods, where they find Mari's body and decide to take revenge. Estelle seduces Weasel, bites off his penis and swallows it, and then leaves him to bleed to death. John takes his shotgun and shoots at Krug and Sadie. Krug escapes into the living room and overpowers John, before manipulating Junior into killing himself. Krug attempts to flee, but after being cornered by a traumatized Sadie and a chainsaw wielding John, is incapacitated by an electrocution booby-trap. Sadie, now horrified of both Krug and John, runs outside. After a scuffle between her and Estelle, she falls into the backyard swimming pool where her throat is slit by Estelle. The sheriff arrives just as John kills Krug with the chainsaw.

Cast
 Sandra Peabody as Mari Collingwood
 Lucy Grantham as Phyllis Stone
 David A. Hess as Krug Stillo
 Fred Lincoln as Fred 'Weasel' Podowski
 Jeramie Rain as Sadie
 Marc Sheffler as Junior Stillo
 Eleanor Shaw (credited as Cynthia Carr) as Estelle Collingwood
 Richard Towers (credited as Gaylord St. James) as Dr. John Collingwood
 Marshall Anker as Sheriff
 Martin Kove as Deputy Harry
 Ada Washington as Ada
 Steve Miner (uncredited) as Hippie Taunting Deputy

Production

Screenplay
Sean S. Cunningham made his directorial debut with the 1970 white coater film The Art of Marriage, which grossed $100,000. The film attracted the attention of Steve Minasian's company Hallmark Releasing, which had a distribution partnership with American International Pictures. Cunningham made the 1971 film Together as a "better version" of The Art of Marriage. Wes Craven, who had no money at the time, was put on the job of synchronizing dailies for Together and soon began editing the film with Cunningham, with whom he became good friends. Hallmark bought the film for $10,000, and it was considered a "hit", prompting the company to persuade Cunningham and Craven to make another film with a bigger budget; the company then gave them $90,000 to shoot a horror film.

Cunningham served as producer and Craven served as writer and director on the project. Written by Craven in 1971, the original script was intended to be a graphic "hardcore" film, with all actors and crew being committed to filming it as such. However, after shooting began, the decision was made to edit the script to be less harsh. This script, written under the title Night of Vengeance, has never been released; only a brief glimpse is visible in the featurette Celluloid Crime of the Century, a 2003 documentary on the making of the film. The crux of the plot is based on the Swedish ballad "Töres döttrar i Wänge", which itself was the basis of Ingmar Bergman's 1960 film The Virgin Spring, of which Craven was an admirer. Craven envisioned a film in which the violence would be shown in detail onscreen, as he felt that many popular films of the era, such as Westerns, glamorized violence and the "vigilante hero", and gave the public a misleading representation of death in the wake of the Vietnam War.

Casting
The majority of the cast of The Last House on the Left were inexperienced or first-time actors, with the exception of Richard Towers, Eleanor Shaw and Sandra Peabody, who were all soap opera regulars and had prior film roles. Cunningham and Craven held casting calls for the film at Cunningham's office in Midtown Manhattan in late 1971. Peabody, who was returning to New York after a cross-country road trip, signed on to the film after responding to a casting notice in the trade publication Backstage. Cunningham and Craven originally wanted her to read for the role of Phyllis; however, after meeting her, they decided to cast her in the lead role of Mari. Shaw was a prominent soap opera actress, and Towers worked as a talent agent in addition to acting. Although she did not recall the specific circumstances of how she became involved with the project, Lucy Grantham was ultimately cast in the role of Mari's best friend Phyllis. The role of the lead villain, Krug Stillo, was given to David Hess, also a musician and songwriter. Jeramie Rain, then twenty-one years old, was playing Susan Atkins in an Off-Broadway production based on the Manson family murders. Despite the fact that the original script called for an actress in her forties, Rain was awarded the part of Sadie. Fred Lincoln, who had appeared in pornographic films, was cast as Krug's criminal partner, while Mark Sheffler was given the role of Krug's heroin-addicted son. Sheffler was a struggling twenty-one year old actor and a client of Towers prior to filming, and was informed of auditions by him. According to Lincoln, he and Peabody were acquaintances and had the same agent at the time.

Filming

The film was shot on location for seven days in New York City, as well as Long Island, followed by shoots in rural locations outside of Westport, Connecticut. While filming in Connecticut, the cast and crew spent much time at producer Cunningham's family's home. According to Craven, the lake sequence was shot in the town reservoir of Weston, Connecticut. Craven sought a "documentary"-style appearance for the film, marked by close-up shots and single-cut takes.

Cunningham later described the film shoot as being "guerrilla-style", with the crew spontaneously filming at locations and being forced to leave due to lack of permits; in retrospect, Lincoln said that "nobody knew what [they] were doing". Much of the special effects in the film were achieved practically, some at Lincoln's suggestion. For example, for the sequence in which Phyllis is disemboweled, Lincoln helped craft fake intestines with condoms filled with fake blood and sand. For the murder sequence of Sadie in the swimming pool, Rain had a pouch full of fake blood attached underneath her shirt, as well as blood capsules in her mouth, which she manually punctured. Grantham recalled that during the scene in which Hess's character tells her to "piss her pants", she in fact urinated in her jeans. Steve Miner, who would later become a director himself, served as a production assistant on the film.

Hess recalled that much of the cast bonded heavily during the filming process since they were mostly inexperienced actors. In the 2003 documentary Celluloid Crime of the Century, Lincoln, Rain and Sheffler recalled similar memories which recounted the making of the film. However, both Hess and director Craven recalled the on-set relationship between Hess and Peabody to be turbulent. Peabody was often treated differently than the rest of the cast to the point that Craven recalled there "not being much acting" during the shooting of the film's more violent scenes. Sheffler admitted during a one-on-one sequence with Peabody that he threatened to push her over a cliff if she failed to hit her marks.

Peabody stated that she was genuinely upset during the filming of the more violent scenes as she felt unprepared: "I was upset because I'm an emotional person, and I reacted to what was going on as if it were real. I had a really hard time with some of scenes, because I had come out of American Playhouse, where it was all about preparation, and everything had to be real. I ended up doing a horrible job in the film. I was very upset, and I felt like I should have channeled that, but I couldn't... I was a young actress and I was still learning to balance any emotions I had from outside of the film into my scene work." Hess revealed that he actually got very physical with her during the filming of the rape scene, and that she could not do anything about it once the camera was running. During this particular shot, assistant director Yvonne Hannemann described it as an upsetting shoot, with her having to be consoled by Craven throughout filming. Peabody recalled, "One of the characters was a method actor, so he was trying to live his part... he'd come after us with a knife at night, trying to freak us out. This was the guy with the dark curly hair [David Hess] - he tried to play his role on and off the set. It was like, 'Lock your doors and windows at night, you don't want him to come get you!' I was scared; I thought this guy had been a killer at some point in his past!" Sandra states that although she was uncertain how a lot of the scenes would turn out, she trusted Craven and Cunningham and their vision for the film.

Music
The film's soundtrack was written by Stephen Chapin and David Hess (who also played the main antagonist, Krug); Chapin wrote all the incidental music, arrangements and orchestration, as well as all the contracting and producing musicians. The music was deliberately written to break with established, conventional horror film scores at that point, employing a mix of 1960s folk rock and bluegrass. It also ran counter to the horror film convention of punctuating moments of fright with shock effects; during some of the film's most violent scenes, music that is completely at odds with the visual content plays.

In 2013, the soundtrack had a re-release on vinyl, compact disc, cassette, and digital download through One Way Static Records. It was also reissued on a limited hand numbered picture disc for Record Store Day 2014.

Release
The film underwent multiple title changes, with its investors initially titling it Sex Crime of the Century. However, after test screenings were completed, it was decided to change the title to Krug and Company, but even this title was found to have little draw during test screenings. A marketing specialist who was an acquaintance of Cunningham's proposed the title The Last House on the Left, which Craven initially thought was "terrible". The film was released under this title on August 30, 1972. Like many films during the era, it had a regional expansion to cinemas and drive-in theaters over the course of the next several months, opening in various U.S. cities between September and November 1972. It was frequently shown as part of a double or triple feature with other Hallmark/AIP releases, most notably Mario Bava's Twitch of the Death Nerve, a film that would also have a considerable impact on the horror genre due to serving as a primary influence on Cunningham's later Friday the 13th franchise.

Due to its graphic content, the film sparked protests calling for its removal from local theaters throughout the fall of 1972. The Paris Cinema, a movie theater in Pittsfield, Massachusetts, issued an open letter to these criticisms in September 1972, in which it was noted:

Promotional material capitalized on the film's graphic content and divisive reception, featuring taglines such as "To avoid fainting, keep repeating 'It's only a movie' ..." Under the Last House title, the film proved to be a hit, although anecdotes as to where the advertising campaign originated vary somewhat. Cunningham claims that marketing specialist who devised the Last House title was watching a cut of the film with his wife, who continually covered her eyes, prompting him to tell her that it was "only a movie". Other origins have been suggested, however, as it had been used twice before: first for H.G. Lewis's 1964 splatter film Color Me Blood Red, and then for William Castle's Strait-Jacket the following year. The tagline was so successful that it was re-purposed by many of Hallmark's other releases, such as Don't Look in the Basement and Don't Open the Window, and other exploitation films, sometimes with a unique spin. The film's title was also imitated, as in the cases of Last House on Dead End Street and The House on the Edge of the Park, another film starring David Hess; other films, such as the aforementioned Twitch of the Death Nerve, were later marketed as unofficial sequels with such titles as Last House Part II.

Newspaper advertisements featured lengthy statements from the film's producers defending it against claims that it sensationalized violence, one of which noted: "You will hate the people who perpetrate these outragesand you should! But if a movieand it is only a moviecan arouse you to such extreme emotion then the film director has succeeded ... The movie makes a plea for an end to all the senseless violence and inhuman cruelty that has become so much a part of the times in which we live." Promotional artwork accompanying such statements included a warning that the film was "not recommended for persons under 30". The film continued to be screened throughout the United States into 1973.

Critical response

Contemporaneous
Critical response to The Last House on the Left upon its original release was largely centered on its depictions of violence. Gene Siskel of the Chicago Tribune derided the film, writing: "My objection to The Last House on the Left is not an objection to the graphic representations of violence per se, but to the fact that the movie celebrates violent acts, particularly adult male abuse of young women ... I felt a professional obligation to stick around to see if there was any socially redeeming value in the remainder of the movie and found none." Howard Thompson of The New York Times wrote that he walked out of the theater during a screening: "When I walked out, after 50 minutes (with 35 to go), one girl had just been dismembered with a machete. They had started in on the other with a slow switch blade. The party who wrote this sickening tripe and also directed the inept actors is Wes Craven. It's at the Penthouse Theater, for anyone interested in paying to see repulsive people and human agony."

Edward Blank of the Pittsburgh Press called the film a "cheap-jack movie of no discernible merit [...] riddled with awkward, self-conscious performances." Roger Ebert, however, gave the film three and a half out of four stars, and described it as "about four times as good as you'd expect". The Christian Science Monitor News Service referred to the film as a "desperately sordid melodrama" and a "vulgarized" version of The Virgin Spring, and drew comparisons to Sam Peckinpah's 1971 film Straw Dogs. Brian Nelson of The Daily Dispatch deemed it the worst film of the year, writing: "Producer Sean S. Cunningham has somehow managed to make what is possibly 1972's most worthless general release film and, with a sensational and overblown advertising campaign, parlay it into a major moneymaker. In doing so, he may be in line for the Cy Dung Award for the movie most offensive to the intelligence of an audience." The Lubbock Avalanche-Journals Bill Towery suggested the film should have received an X rating, adding in his review: "Films such as these give the movie ratings system a bad name. But if your cup of tea is assault, murder, maiming, revenge, and violence, the movie is going to be perfect."

Modern assessment

On review aggregator Rotten Tomatoes, The Last House on the Left holds an approval rating of 63%, based on 40 reviews, and an average rating of 6.2/10. Its consensus reads, "Its visceral brutality is more repulsive than engrossing, but The Last House on the Left nevertheless introduces director Wes Craven as a distinctive voice in horror." On Metacritic, the film has a weighted average score of 68 out of 100, based on 8 critics, indicating "generally favorable reviews".

Author and film critic Leonard Maltin awarded the film one-and-a-half out of a possible four stars. Maltin called the film "cheap", and "[a] repellent but admittedly powerful and (for better or worse) influential horror shocker." The film was nominated for AFI's 100 Years...100 Thrills.

Censorship

United States
Though the film passed with an R-rating by the Motion Picture Association of America after numerous cuts were made, director Craven claimed that on several occasions, horrified audience members would demand that theater projectionists destroy the footage, sometimes stealing the film themselves. John Saco, a British film archivist, recalled discussing the film with American theater owners: "Projectionists were so offended, they would just cut up the film as they were watching it. I'd ask people, 'How cut is your version?' They'd say, 'It's not as cut as some of the others I've seen' – that's hardly what you want to hear!"

United Kingdom
Last House on the Left was refused a certificate for cinema release by the British Board of Film Censors in 1974, due to scenes of sadism and violence. During the early 1980s home video boom, the film was released uncut (save for an incidental, gore-free scene with the comic relief cops, and the end credit roll) as a video that did not fall under the BBFC's remit at the time. This changed when the "video nasty" scare which started in 1982 led to the Video Recordings Act 1984. The movie landed on the Department of Public Prosecutions list of "video nasties", and was banned.

The film remained banned throughout the remainder of the 1980s and into the 1990s. However, it had developed an underground cult reputation in the UK, and critics such as Mark Kermode began to laud the film as an important piece of work. In 2000, the film was again presented to the BBFC for theatrical certification and it was again refused. The independent film label Blue Underground toured an uncut print around Britain without a BBFC certificate; Southampton City Council granted it its own "18" certificate. The film was granted a license for a one-off showing in Leicester in June 2000, after which the BBFC again declared that it would not receive any form of certification.

In June 2002 the BBFC prevailed against an appeal made to the Video Appeals Committee by video distributor Blue Underground Limited. The BBFC had required 16 seconds of cuts to scenes of sexual violence before it would grant the video an "18" certificate. Blue Underground Limited refused to make the cuts, and the BBFC therefore rejected the video. The distributor then appealed to the VAC, who upheld the BBFC's decision. During the appeal, film critic Kermode was called in as a horror expert to make a case for the film's historical importance. However, after his report, the committee not only upheld the cuts, but demanded additional ones. The film was eventually given an "18" certificate, on July 17, 2002, with 31 seconds of cuts, and was released in the UK on DVD in May 2003. The cut scenes were viewable as a slideshow extra on the disc, and there was a link to a website where the cut scenes could be viewed. The BBFC finally classified the uncut film at 18 for video release on March 17, 2008.

Australia
Contrary to popular belief, the film was never banned in Australia on its initial release – rather, it was never picked up for distribution in the country due to the censorship issues that it would have created at the time. The film was submitted to the censorship board in 1987 for VHS release by Video Excellence under the alternative title Krug and Company, but it was rejected because of its violent and sexual content. In October 1991, The Last House on the Left was part of a package of fifteen tapes that was seized by the Australian Customs Service. The package of tapes was forwarded to the Australian Classification Board (then known as the Office of Film and Literature Classification) who declared them "prohibited pursuant to Regulation 4A(1A)(a)(iii) of the Customs (Prohibited Imports) Regulations". The film was eventually classified "R" by the OFLC for its DVD premiere on November 15, 2004. It had a theatrical screening that same month at the Australian Centre for the Moving Image in Melbourne.

Rare or lost scenes
Many different versions of the film exist on various DVD and VHS releases struck from different cuts of the film, many of them from different countries. To get a completely uncut version is difficult as even some cinema machinists cut footage from prints of the movie before screening it during the 1970s; many copies were cut or "hacked to pieces" and because of this, some scenes have become rarities.

Some incomplete scenes are:
 "Lesbian rape scene" – One scene long thought lost, except as a photographic still, is the two female victims forced to commit sexual acts on each other in the woods. This forced lesbian rape scene was included as an outtake with no sound on the Metrodome Three-Disc DVD Ultimate Edition and on the 2011 Blu-ray release.
 "Mari in her room" – In the beginning of the movie, photographic stills show Mari in her room reading birthday cards while she is nude; this scene no longer exists.
 "Mari raped by Sadie" – Footage of Sadie committing sexual acts against Mari in the woods is often removed, even from some DVDs that have been labeled as "uncut".

In the Krug and Company cut, Mari is still alive when her parents find her. She tells her parents what happened to her and Phyllis before dying in front of them.

Home media
The Last House on the Left has been released multiple times on home media in the United States; MGM Home Entertainment released a DVD version on August 27, 2002, which featured outtakes, a making-of documentary, and "Forbidden Footage," a featurette exploring the film's most violent shocking sequences. On February 1, 2011, a Blu-ray was released by MGM through 20th Century Fox Home Entertainment, which featured multiple featurettes and making-of documentaries, two audio commentary tracks, never-before-seen footage, and cast and crew interviews.

A limited edition Blu-ray box set was released in the United States and United Kingdom on July 3, 2018 from Arrow Video, which features three different cuts of the film each restored in 2K from the original film elements, a double-sided poster, lobby card reproductions, a book featuring writings on the film, a CD soundtrack, various archival bonus materials, and new interviews with cast, crew, and associates of Craven.

Related works

Sequel
In the 1980s, Vestron Pictures hired Danny Steinmann to write and direct a sequel, though the film fell apart in pre-production due to rights issues. Mario Bava's film Twitch of the Death Nerve was also released under the titles Last House on the Left – Part II, Last House – Part II and New House on the Left.

Remake

In August 2006, Rogue Pictures finalized a deal to remake The Last House on the Left with original writer and director Wes Craven as a producer.  The company intended to preserve the storyline of the original film. Craven described his involvement with the remake: "I'm far enough removed from these films that the remakes are a little like having grandchildren. The story, about the painful side effects of revenge, is an evergreen. The headlines are full of people and nations taking revenge and getting caught up in endless cycles of violence." Craven formed Midnight Pictures, a shingle of Rogue, to remake The Last House on the Left as its first project. Production was slated for early 2007. Screenwriter Adam Alleca was hired to write the script for the remake.

In May 2007, Rogue entered negotiations with director Dennis Iliadis to direct the film. The film was released to theaters in the U.S. and Canada on March 13, 2009.

See also
 List of American films of 1972
 List of films featuring home invasions
 List of incomplete or partially lost films
 Last Podcast on the Left

Notes

References

Sources

External links

 
 
 
 

1972 films
1970s exploitation films
1972 horror films
1970s slasher films
American exploitation films
Rape and revenge films
1972 independent films
American independent films
American slasher films
Crime films based on actual events
Film controversies
1970s English-language films
Films about child abduction in the United States
American films about revenge
Films about violence against women
Films based on adaptations
Films directed by Wes Craven
Obscenity controversies in film
American rape and revenge films
American serial killer films
Torture in films
American vigilante films
Video nasties
Film controversies in the United States
Film controversies in the United Kingdom
American International Pictures films
1972 directorial debut films
Films originally rejected by the British Board of Film Classification
1970s American films